In biology, a clasper is a male anatomical structure found in some groups of animals, used in mating.

 
Male cartilaginous fish have claspers formed from the posterior portion of their pelvic fin which serve to channel semen into the female's cloaca during mating. The act of mating in some fish including sharks usually includes one of the claspers raised to allow water into the siphon through a specific orifice.  The clasper is then inserted into the cloaca, where it opens like an umbrella to anchor its position. The siphon then begins to contract, expelling water and sperm. The claspers of many shark species have spines or hooks, which may hold them in place during copulation. Male chimaeras have cephalic claspers (tenacula) on their heads, which are thought to aid in holding the female during mating. 

In entomology, it is a structure in male insects that is used to hold the female during copulation (see Lepidoptera genitalia for more).

See also
Sexual coercion among animals

References

Fish anatomy
Insect anatomy
Animal reproductive system